James William Moore (April 24, 1903 – March 7, 1986) was an American professional baseball left fielder. He played in Major League Baseball (MLB) for two seasons with the Chicago White Sox (1930) and Philadelphia Athletics (1930–1931). He attended Union University.

In a two-season career, Moore was a .254 hitter (59-for-232) with four home runs and 35 RBI in 80 games, including 32 runs, 10 doubles, one triple, one stolen base, and a .316 on-base percentage.

Moore died at the age of 82 in Memphis, Tennessee. He was the last surviving member of the 1930 World Champion Philadelphia Athletics.

External links

Chicago White Sox players
Philadelphia Athletics players
Major League Baseball left fielders
Union Bulldogs baseball players
Baseball players from Tennessee
1903 births
1986 deaths
People from Paris, Tennessee
Paris Parisians (KITTY League) players